Ruth Hyde Paine (born September 3, 1932) was a friend of Marina Oswald, who was living with her at the time of the JFK assassination. According to four government investigations, Lee Harvey Oswald stored the 6.5 mm caliber Carcano rifle that he used to assassinate U.S. President John F. Kennedy in Ruth Paine's garage, unbeknownst to her and her husband, Michael Paine.

Ruth Paine answered more than 5,000 questions for the Warren Commission.  There were over 500 witnesses for the Warren Commission, and the average number of questions asked for each witness was less than 300.  Furthermore, Ruth Paine has given more interviews than any other Warren Commission witness, always consistent with her Warren Commission testimony.

Background 
Paine was born Ruth Avery Hyde in New York City, to her parents, William A. and Carol E. Hyde. She went to Antioch College and became a Quaker. Through her interest in folk dancing and music she met her future husband Michael Paine. Though strictly speaking not a Quaker, Michael attended meetings with Ruth. They married on December 28, 1957.

In 1959 Michael Paine got a job with Bell Helicopter in Fort Worth, Texas and the Paines moved into a house in the suburb of Irving (Michael Paine's step-father, Arthur M. Young, invented the Bell Helicopter). As liberals in Dallas, the Paines were isolated, and Ruth Paine was quite lonely.

Ruth Paine had been studying Russian since 1957. In the late 1950s she participated in Quaker pen pal programs and the East-West Contact Committee, which sponsored visits by three Soviets to the US. In 1963 she signed up to teach a summer class in Russian at St. Mark's School in Dallas, but only one student signed up (William Hootkins, who became an actor and had a minor role in the movie Star Wars as X-wing pilot Jek Porkins).

Ruth Paine met the Oswalds through her interest in the Russian language.  She had learned to read Russian, but she had difficulty with conversational Russian.  Also, she and Michael Paine were separated at this time.  A mutual friend from their Madrigal singing group, Everett Glover, invited her to a party at his apartment on February 22, 1963, because he thought she would be interested in meeting two interesting people who spoke Russian.

The attendance of the couple, Lee and Marina Oswald, was arranged by Oswald's friend, 51-year-old Russian émigré George de Mohrenschildt, a well-educated petroleum geologist with intelligence connections.

John F. Kennedy assassination

Involvement with Oswald family
Ruth Paine drove Marina Oswald to New Orleans when the Oswalds moved there in May 1963 and back to Dallas when they moved again in September 1963. When the Oswalds resettled in the Dallas area, Marina and her child with Lee, June, moved in with Ruth Paine in the suburb of Irving, Texas while Lee stayed in a boarding house under the name O.H. Lee.  The second Oswald child was born after Marina moved in. Marina helped with the housework and Ruth's Russian studies while Lee visited on weekends. Michael and Ruth had long been separated, but remained on good terms.  Michael was a frequent visitor and cared for his children deeply. At the suggestion of a neighbor, Linnie Mae Randle, Ruth Paine told Lee Oswald about a job opportunity at the Texas School Book Depository.

Lee Harvey Oswald stayed at the Paine home with Marina and his children unannounced on Thursday night, November 21, 1963—the night before President Kennedy was assassinated. When Oswald left for work on the morning of November 22, he brought a large package that he had kept in the Paine's garage with him to work at the Texas School Book Depository. Oswald's coworker and friend, Wesley Frazier testified that Oswald told him the bag contained curtain rods. The evidence demonstrated that the package actually contained the rifle used by Oswald in the assassination.

Eight days after the assassination of President Kennedy, on November 30, 1963, Ruth Paine inadvertently discovered evidence that Lee Oswald had attempted to assassinate General Edwin Walker. Among the letters that Ruth Paine repeatedly sent to Marina was a thick book of household advice in Russian. The book contained an undated note left by Lee for Marina on April 10, 1963 (the day of the Walker assassination attempt) that Marina later testified she had concealed. Before the Kennedy assassination, Dallas police had no suspects in the Walker shooting.

Aftermath of assassination
Ruth Paine testified before the Warren Commission and has been interviewed by a number of authors, including Priscilla Johnson McMillan, William Manchester, Thomas Mallon, and Gerald Posner. She has appeared in numerous documentaries and even a mock trial of Lee Harvey Oswald. She also testified in Jim Garrison's trial of Clay Shaw. Paine was not called to testify before the House Select Committee on Assassinations.

After the assassination, Marina and Lee Oswald's mother Marguerite briefly stayed with Ruth Paine until Marina was taken into custody by the Secret Service. Marguerite and Lee's brother Robert did not like Ruth Paine, which may have influenced Marina Oswald. They thought Paine sought attention for herself, an opinion Marina would later express before the Warren Commission. Ruth wrote to Marina incessantly, with letters that took an almost desperate tone, but received no response except for a Christmas card. They met briefly in 1964 but have not seen each other since. Paine heard news about Marina through author Priscilla Johnson McMillan until McMillan's relationship with Marina broke off in the early 1980s.

Ruth Paine returned to Pennsylvania and became principal of a Quaker school, the Greene Street Friends School located in Germantown.  She soon moved to St. Petersburg, Florida and earned a master's degree in psychology from the University of South Florida. After working for the school system in Franklin County in the Florida Panhandle, she returned to St. Petersburg and worked for the Hillsborough County, Florida school system until her retirement. She is active in Quaker and liberal charities and organizations and lives in Santa Rosa, California.

The City of Irving bought the former Paine home in 2009 and has been restoring it to its 1963 condition to be turned into a museum in time for the 50th anniversary of the Kennedy assassination on November 22, 2013.

In Oliver Stone's JFK, the Paines are depicted as the highly suspect Bill and Janet Williams, played by Gary Carter and Gail Cronauer. While most names in the movie JFK were not changed, the Paines were renamed to avoid potential legal action.  (The name Janet Williams was used again in the 1993 TV movie Fatal Deception: Mrs. Lee Harvey Oswald, in which the role was played by Quenby Bakke.

Television and film
 2022 The Assassination & Mrs. Paine
 2013 Ruth & Marina
 1986 On Trial: Lee Harvey Oswald

References

Further reading
 Thomas Mallon, Mrs. Paine's Garage and the Murder of John F. Kennedy.  .
 Priscilla Johnson McMillan, Marina and Lee.  .
 James W. Douglass, JFK and the Unspeakable.  .

External links
"The Assassination & Mrs. Paine," An Upcoming Feature Documentary on Ruth Paine
Ruth Paine Home - Museum, Irving, TX
Excerpt from Mrs. Paine's Garage
The JFK 100: One Hundred Errors of Fact and Judgment in Oliver Stone's JFK: "Bill and Janet Williams"
Paine's letter to Jim Garrison

1932 births
Living people
American Quakers
American tax resisters
Antioch College alumni
Converts to Quakerism
People associated with the assassination of John F. Kennedy
People from Irving, Texas
Educators from New York City
University of South Florida alumni